Shahmar or Shah Mar may refer to:
Shahmar, East Azerbaijan
Shahmar-e Baba Morad, Dalahu County, Kermanshah Province
Shahmar-e Mirza Morad, Dalahu County, Kermanshah Province
Shahmar, Gilan-e Gharb, Kermanshah Province
Shah Mar, Sahneh, Kermanshah Province